Caligula japonica, the Japanese giant silkworm, is a moth of the family Saturniidae. It was described by Frederic Moore in 1872. It is found in eastern Asia, including China, Korea, Japan and Russia.

The larvae feed on various plants, including Salix, Fagus, Quercus and Juglans.

Subspecies
C. japonica japonica
C. japonica arisana (Shiraki, 1913)
C. japonica ryukyuensis (Inoue, 1984)

References

External links
Species info

Caligula (moth)
Moths described in 1872
Moths of Asia
Moths of Japan
Moths of Korea
Taxa named by Frederic Moore